Woodland Township is one of 26 townships in Fulton County, Illinois, USA.  As of the 2010 census, its population was 415 and it contained 195 housing units.

Geography

Unincorporated towns
 Beaty at 
 Leesburg at 
 Summum at 
(This list is based on USGS data and may include former settlements.)

Cemeteries
The township contains these five cemeteries: Hart, Mount Zion, Summum, Summum Sixteen, and Woodland.

Major highways
  U.S. Route 24
  Illinois Route 100

Airports and landing strips
 Curless Airport

Landmarks
 Izaac Walton Park-private property

Demographics

School districts
 Astoria Community Unit School District 1
 Lewistown School District 97

Political districts
 Illinois' 17th congressional district
 State House District 94
 State Senate District 47

References
 
 United States Census Bureau 2007 TIGER/Line Shapefiles
 United States National Atlas

External links
 City-Data.com
 Illinois State Archives

Townships in Fulton County, Illinois
Townships in Illinois